Sandham Memorial Chapel is in the village of Burghclere, Hampshire, England. It is a Grade I listed, 1920s decorated chapel, designed by Lionel Godfrey Pearson. The chapel was built to accommodate a series of paintings by the English artist Stanley Spencer. It was commissioned by Mary and Louis Behrend (1881–1972) as a memorial to Mary's brother, Lieutenant Henry Willoughby Sandham who died of illness contracted in Macedonia after the First World War.  The chapel is surrounded by lawns and orchards, with views of Watership Down.

It is run by the National Trust and is open to the public.

Paintings 

Spencer's series of seventeen paintings was inspired by his own experiences during the First World War, in which he served as an orderly with the Royal Army Medical Corps, first at Beaufort War Hospital in Bristol, and then on the Macedonian front, where he was subsequently transferred to the infantry. He was influenced by Giotto’s Arena Chapel murals in Padua. He wanted to paint frescoes too, but the environmental conditions were not appropriate. The subsequent paintings were commissioned in 1923, with Spencer moving to Burghclere in 1926 to work in situ. The series was completed in 1932. It is dominated by the Resurrection scene behind the altar, in which dozens of British soldiers lay the white wooden crosses that marked their graves at the feet of a distant Christ. The series chronicles Spencer's everyday experiences of the war rather than any scenes of action. When the art historian R. H. Wilenski saw the recently completed sequence, he wrote of his sense "that every one of the thousand memories recorded had been driven into the artist's consciousness like a sharp-pointed nail".

Name 

The Chapel is consecrated as The Oratory of All Saints and only became officially recognised by its colloquial name Sandham Memorial Chapel following the National Trust's takeover of the property. Spencer would refer to it as his "Holy-Box", whilst the architect and patrons would privately refer to it as Spencer's "God-Box". Meanwhile, John and Mary Behrend's children pejoratively called it the "biscuit factory", in response to its "municipal" characteristics.

References

Bibliography

 
 
  
 Bromwell, Tom (2014). The God-Box of Burghclere. National Trust Historic Houses and Collections Annual, Apollo Magazine

External links

  Images of the Sandham Memorial Chapel artworks at Art UK

Chapels in England
Church of England church buildings in Hampshire
Grade I listed churches in Hampshire
Grade I listed museum buildings
Murals in the United Kingdom
National Trust properties in Hampshire
Tourist attractions in Hampshire
War paintings
Museums in Hampshire
Art museums and galleries in Hampshire